Savelyevka is a rural locality (a village) in Otradinsky Selsoviet, Kuyurgazinsky District, Bashkortostan, Russia. The population was 40 as of 2010. There are 2 streets.

Geography 
Savelyevka is located 23 km south of Yermolayevo (the district's administrative centre) by road. Staraya Otrada is the nearest rural locality.

References 

Rural localities in Kuyurgazinsky District